Moose River may refer to:

Rivers

Canada
Moose River (British Columbia)
Moose River (Nova Scotia), site of the Moose River Gold Mines, Nova Scotia
Moose River (Ontario)
Moose River (Québec)

United States
Moose River (Maine)
Moose River (Namakan Lake), Minnesota
Moose River (Nina Moose River), Minnesota
Moose River (Thief Lake), Minnesota
Moose River (Willow River), Minnesota
Moose River (New Hampshire)
Moose River (New York)
Moose River (Vermont)
Moose River (Alaska), tributary of the Kenai River
Moose River Site, an archeological site at the confluence of the Moose and Kenai rivers

Places
Moose River, Maine, United States

See also 
 Moose (disambiguation)